The  Australian Country Football League (WACFL) is the governing body for the sport of Australian rules football in the non-metropolitan areas of Western Australia. The organisation was founded in 1973 as the Western Australian National Country Football League (WANCFL),  its name to the current in 1979. The WACFL is also responsible for organising the Landmark Country Football Championships, contested between the various regional sides. The Australian Country Football Championships were hosted by Bunbury in 2004.

Structure
The association is structured around eight Regional Football Development Councils which are responsible for assisting the development of the game in regional areas:
 Goldfields RFDC
 Great Southern RFDC
 Kimberley RFDC
 Midlands RFDC
 Mid West RFDC
 Pilbara RFDC
 South West RFDC
 Wheatbelt RFDC

Football leagues are associated individually with the WACFL. As of 2012, there are 25 football leagues which fall under the association's authority:
 Avon Football Association
 Central Kimberley Football Association
 Central Midlands Coastal Football League
 Central Wheatbelt Football League
 East Kimberley Football Association
 Eastern Districts Football League
 Esperance District Football Association
 Fortescue National Football League
 Gascoyne Football Association
 Goldfields Football League
 Great Northern Football League
 Great Southern Football League
 Hills Football Association
 Lower South West Football League
 Mortlock Football League
 North Midlands Football League
 Newman National Football League
 North Pilbara Football League
 Ongerup Football Association
 Onshore Cup Football League
 Peel Football League
 South West Football League
 Ravensthorpe & Districts Football League
 Upper Great Southern Football League
 West Kimberley Football League

Presidents
 1973–91 "Bud" Byfield
 1991–2001 John J. Lussick
 2001–08 Ken Baxter
 2008–18 Terry House
 2018–present John Shadbolt

References

Australian rules football governing bodies
Country football
Country football
Sports organizations established in 1973